Bademli is a village in the Keban District of Elazığ Province in Turkey. The village is populated by Kurds and had a population of 68 in 2021.

The hamlet of Yaşar is attached to the village.

References

Villages in Keban District
Kurdish settlements in Elazığ Province